Tour of Yancheng Coastal Wetlands is a men's one-day cycle race which takes place in China. The first edition was a one-day race and was rated by the UCI as a 1.2 event as part of the UCI Asia Tour. The 2015 edition included two stages and was rated as a 2.2 event.

Overall winners

References

Cycle races in China
Yangcheng
Autumn events in China